Marcé is a commune in the Maine-et-Loire department in western France.

See also
 Angers - Loire Airport
 Communes of the Maine-et-Loire department

References

Communes of Maine-et-Loire